The 2023 USFL season is the upcoming second season of the United States Football League.

Location

The league stated their intentions to expand the locations in which teams play, from one (Birmingham, Alabama) in the previous season, to two or four. As of October 2022, the league had not yet committed to returning to Birmingham as one of the hubs. In November, the league announced an agreement with Birmingham to continue hosting two of the league's eight teams in the city, the Stallions and the Breakers, at Protective Stadium.

On November 15, 2022, the league announced that it had secured an agreement to play games at Simmons Bank Liberty Stadium (formerly known as the Liberty Bowl) in Memphis, Tennessee.

For the North Division, the league has contacted two stadiums in Michigan, Ford Field in Detroit and Rynearson Stadium in Ypsilanti, as potential locations for a North Division hub, with the Panthers as the host team. It was later reveled that Ford Field will be the home of the Michigan Panthers and Philadelphia Stars, while Rynearson Stadium will host the teams practices.

On January 25, 2023, the league announced that the New Jersey Generals and the Pittsburgh Maulers (who will sport a new gold-and-black uniform color scheme to emphasize the team's Pittsburgh identity) will play its home games at Tom Benson Hall of Fame Stadium in Canton, with the Generals as the host teams. The stadium will also be the site of both the North Division playoff game and the 2023 USFL Championship Game, as it was in 2022.

Teams
On November 15, 2022, in conjunction with its agreement to play at Simmons Bank Liberty Stadium, the USFL announced that the Memphis Showboats would be replacing the Tampa Bay Bandits for the 2023 season. The seven other teams in the league will return as they were in 2022.

Players
For the 2023 season, each USFL team will start training camp with 58-men rosters, with mandatory cut down to 54 and then a last cut down to 50. The final rosters will be 40 active players and 10 inactive players on game days. The league also started a partnership with HUB Football for the 2023 season for players tryouts.

Compensation
On December 15, 2022, USFL player representatives (United Football Players Association and United Steelworkers) and the league parent company FOX Sports tentatively agreed on a new three-year collective bargaining agreement starting at the 2023 season, six months after the league players voted to unionize. The proposed agreement increases minimum salaries and provides a stronger benefits package than they previously received, and slightly higher than most XFL salaries. USFL players' minimum salaries will be $5,350 per week, up from the current $4,500 per week payout ($2,500 for inactive players) and $150 a week toward 401K contributions, while weekly performance bonuses will be cancelled. During training camp, all USFL players will get $850 a week. The new deal also include a $400 per week housing stipend. For the first year of the CBA, the roster size will stay at 50 (40 active/10 inactive), while from the second year going forward the makeup changes to 42 active and 8 inactive plus a newly negotiated five-week injured reserve. The proposed CBA includes an annual opt-out option. The agreement was approved by the union members on January 9, 2023.

As of 2022 season, USFL players and staff are still able to receive a college degree "tuition-free and debt-free", through a partnership with for-profit universities Strategic Education's Capella University and Strayer University.

Draft

The 10-round 2023 USFL College Draft took place on February 21, 2023 while draft pool included over 3,000 eligible players. The first overall pick was decided by the winner of the Week 10 game between the 1–8 Pittsburgh Maulers and 1–8 Michigan Panthers, would win the first overall pick. The Panthers were victorious 33–21. The New Jersey Generals had their 1st round selection moved to the last pick in the draft and their rounds 2 to 5 picks were penalized due to "a violation of offseason roster management rules". Michigan State offensive lineman Jarrett Horst was the first overall pick.

Player movement

 On January 27, it was reported that former NFL first-round pick linebacker Reuben Foster will sign with the Pittsburgh Maulers.

 On February 8 the Showboats signed quarterback Ryan Willis after he was released from the XFL's St. Louis Battlehawks.

 On February 18 the Stars resigned quarterback Case Cookus after a short stint with the NFL's Los Angeles Rams.

 On February 20 the Stars inked former NFL first-round pick, receiver Corey Coleman.

 On February 22 Grey Cup champion quarterback McLeod Bethel-Thompson announced he would leave the CFL and that he had signed with the New Orleans Breakers.

Coaching changes
On March 15, all teams announced their coaching staffs for the upcoming season.

Rule changes
For the 2023 season the league intend to change the clock stopping rules, so every game will be played in a three-hour window, while kickoffs will be from the 20-yard line.

Standings

Season structure

Preseason
Training camp will start on March 21 in each team specific hub, a day later than what they had scheduled last year.

Regular season
The league announced that they are keeping their same scheduling format, with the regular season starting in April and ending in June, with playoffs extending through to early July. The schedule was released on February 7, 2023, announcing April 15th as the opening day for the season.

Season schedule
All games produced by NBC Sports will stream on Peacock unless otherwise noted. Viewership figures for streaming platform released four weeks after the event.

Week 1

Week 2

Week 3

Week 4

Week 5

Week 6

Week 7

Week 8

Week 9

Week 10

Playoffs 
The playoffs will start on June 24 and will end with the championship game on July 1.  The USFL Championship Game is scheduled to be played at Tom Benson Hall of Fame Stadium.

League finances
After the 2022 season, Fox Sports had hired investment bank Allen & Company to find minority investors to help fund the league's expansion into local markets, with a plan to raise between $150 million and $200 million.

For the 2023 regular season ticket prices will range from $25 to $120.

Media 
Telecasts for the 2023 season will be produced by Fox Sports and NBC Sports, in all Fox will still broadcast the most games with 17 regular season games and 1 semi-final, NBC will broadcast 9 regular season games, 1 semi-final and the Championship game. Peacock will continue simulcast all NBC games but no longer have exclusive regular season games. Other games air on Cable networks USA Network and FS1 (7 games each).

Both Fox Sports and NBC Sports are making two moves in an effort to increase the league's exposure for this season:
All games will be presented on linear outlets Fox, FS1, NBC, or USA Network; Peacock will stream all NBC broadcasts, but unlike 2022 will not carry any games exclusively.
An emphasis will be made on having high-profile events serve as lead-ins to the league mostly on broadcast television, with some games following NASCAR and Major League Baseball broadcasts on Fox or the Kentucky Derby on NBC (with 29 games including playoffs will be airing on broadcast television).

Fox will likely bring back its lead XFL broadcast team from 2020, Curt Menefee and Joel Klatt, for USFL coverage. Kevin Kugler and Mark Sanchez serve as the second broadcast team. Brock Huard reports from the sidelines during selected games.

The NBC crew features Jac Collinsworth and Paul Burmeister handling play-by-play duties alongside analysts Jason Garrett, Michael Robinson and Cameron Jordan. Zora Stephenson and Corey Robinson are sideline reporters and Sara Perlman hosts halftime and post-game coverage.

See also 
 2023 XFL season

References

2023 USFL season
United States Football League (2022)